Johanna Fenichel, née Heilborn (Berlin, Germany 21 October 1897 - Los Angeles, California 12 October 1975) was a child psychologist.

Johanna Fenichel, also known as Hanna, was the daughter of Ernst Heilborn, a director of the Allgemeine Elektricitäts-Gesellschaft (AEG), which is German for; "General Electricity Company", and her mother, Antonie Heilborn. She became a social worker in 1916 after attending a private school named Sprengelschen in Berlin. After years of practicing her profession, she became a part of the Technical University of Berlin where she later got her doctorate in Chemistry in 1932. A year later, she moved to Paris, France where she continued her education. Another year later, she moved to Prague where she was a part of the Prague Psychoanalytical Association and where she met her future husband, Otto Fenichel.

Still unmarried, in 1938 Heilborn emigrated to Los Angeles, California, where she became a member of the Los Angeles Psychoanalytic Study Group. She specialized in early childhood development and studies, as well as teaching analysis. She was a leading member of the  Los Angeles Psychoanalytic Institute. She studied children from the ages of eighteen months to five years and how they acted or reacted, and their thoughts. 

In 1940, she married Otto Fenichel. On 12 October 1975, she died of cancer in Brentwood, Los Angeles County, California.

After she died, the Hanna Fenichel Center was founded by San Diego Psychoanalytic Society and Institute. The program's overview is "to create a nurturing community that supports each child's growing sense of self and innate passion for learning...through social, educational, and artistic environments.

Works
Fenichel conducted broad works throughout the years of 1940s and 1950s with the second generation of Freudian scholars and psychoanalysts. Hannah worked with Richard Loewenberg is a different subject and they have a separate collection of work.

 (ed. with David Rapaport) The collected papers of Otto Fenichel

In 1938 she presented her project on the problematic of Archaic Object Relations as part of the Viennese Psychoanalytical Association.

References

External links 
 FENICHEL Hanna
 Hanna Fenichel
 

1897 births
1975 deaths
German psychoanalysts
American psychoanalysts
German emigrants to the United States